Lebedodes willihaberlandi is a moth in the family Metarbelidae. It is found in Tanzania, where it has been recorded from the Mufindi Forests. The habitat consists of montane and upper montane woodlands and bushland.

The length of the forewings is about 12.5 mm. The forewings are pale olive-buff with a buffy brown streak in the upper centre of the cell and a large spot below the lower angle of the cell. The terminal line, subterminal line, postmedial line and distal line are reduced to buffy brown striae. The hindwings are light-buff.

Etymology
The species is named for Willi Eduard Haberland, the grandfather of the author.

References

Natural History Museum Lepidoptera generic names catalog

Endemic fauna of Tanzania
Metarbelinae
Moths described in 2008